General Electric Summer Originals is an anthology series that aired on the American Broadcasting Company in the summer of 1956.  The 30-minute episodes consisted of dramatic films never before seen on television. Among its guest stars were Ronald Reagan, James Mason, Vera Miles, Hugh Beaumont, and Barbara Billingsley. Its directors included feature directors Budd Boetticher and Don Weis.

References

External links
General Electric Summer Originals at CVTA

1950s American anthology television series
1956 American television series debuts
1956 American television series endings
American Broadcasting Company original programming
Black-and-white American television shows